The music of Angola (Dimba dya N’gola) has been shaped both by wider musical trends and by the political history of the country. while Angolan music has also influenced the music of the other Lusophone countries and Latin American countries. In turn, the music of Angola was instrumental in creating and reinforcing "angolanidade", the Angolan national identity.  The capital and largest city of Angola — Luanda — is home to a diverse group of styles including  kazukuta,  semba, kizomba and kuduro. Just off the coast of Luanda is Ilha do Cabo, home to an accordion and harmonica-based style of music called rebita.

In the 20th century, Angola was wracked by violence and political instability. Angolan musicians were oppressed by government forces, both during the period of Portuguese colonization and after independence.

Folk music

Semba

Semba is the predecessor to a variety of music styles originating in Africa. Three of the most famous of these are Samba itself, kizomba, and kuduro.

The subject matter of Semba is often a cautionary tale or story regarding day-to-day life and social events and activities, usually sung in a witty rhetoric. Through Semba music, the artist is able to convey a broad spectrum of emotions. It is this characteristic that has made Semba the premiere style of music for a wide variety of Angolan social gatherings. Its versatility is evident in its inevitable presence at funerals and, on the other hand, many Angolan parties.

Semba is very much alive and popular in Angola today as it was long before that country's independence from the Portuguese colonial system on November 11, 1975. Various new Semba artists emerge each year in Angola, as they render homage to the veteran semba masters, many of whom are still performing. Other styles related to the Semba is Rebita, which is inspired by European line dances, as well as kazukuta and kabetula which are primarily Carnaval Music.

Barceló de Carvalho, the Angolan singer popularly known as Bonga, is arguably the most successful Angolan artist to popularize semba music internationally; it is generally being categorized as World music.

Popular music

Colonial times
Angola's popular music has had little international success.

In the 1800s Angolan musicians in the cities experimented with popular styles worldwide, including waltzes and ballads. With the first half of the twentieth century came big bands, who sang in both Portuguese and Kimbundu

The first group to become known outside of Angola was Duo Ouro Negro, created in 1956. After a successful sting in Portugal, the duo toured Switzerland, France, Finland, Sweden, Denmark and Spain. After them came Orquestra os Jovens do Prenda, who were most popular from the late 1960s to the early 1970s and have continued to perform and record sporadically. The big band included two trumpets, a saxophone, four guitars and a half-dozen percussion instruments.  They played kizomba (a native style based around the marimba xylophone), using the four guitars to approximate the sound of the marimba, and quilapanga. Besides that early 60s until late 70s some other groups like Kiezos, Negoleiros do Ritmo, Cabinda Ritmos, Super Coba, Ngoma Jazz, Africa Show, Ases do Prenda, Aguias Reais, Bongos do Lobito, etc. were the main bands in Angola playing Angolan music before Angolan independence on November 11, 1975. These groups were based in Luanda, and Lobito in Benguela province.

The acoustic guitarist Liceu Vieira Dias and his band Ngola Ritmos, is, however, the father of the most Angolan popular music, called semba.  He introduced the ensembles of dikanza (scraper), ngomas (conga drums) and violas, which became popular in the 1950s in urban areas, where audiences liked the politicized messages and early nationalist thought.  Dias was imprisoned by the Portuguese for many years.

In the years just before the civil war, the Luanda rock music scene sizzled. One member of a top band said that being in a band then was like being in a top football team; when his band walked into a club, all his supporters would cheer (and rival bands' groupies would hiss).

Two other prominent musicians of the pre-independence era included David Zé and Urbano de Castro, both of whom were assassinated as a result of their political activism.

Beginning in the 1970s, Bonga became the most well-known Angolan pop musician outside the country.  He began performing in the early 1960s when Angolan folk music was finding some popularity.  As a member of Kissueia, he addressed social problems while also becoming a soccer star.  He was moved to Lisbon by the colonial government, and he there played soccer until 1972, when he left to protest Portugal's colonial war in Angola. Bonga's "Mona Ki Ngi Xica" (1972) earned him an arrest warrant, and he began travelling between Germany, France and Belgium until Angola gained independence in 1975.

Post-independence

After independence came civil war. Many popular musicians were killed, and some who were spared simply left the country.

In the early 1980s, Angolan popular music was deeply influenced by Cuban music, especially in the work of André Mingas and brother Rui Mingas. Cuban Rumba was popular and influential across southern Africa, including Angola's neighbor Zaire (renamed the Democratic Republic of the Congo), where it became the basis for soukous.  In addition to the spread of recorded Cuban music, the presence of Cuban troops allied with the Marxist MPLA movement helped to popularize Cuban rhythms.

Two of the most well-known songs from Angola are Humbi Hummbi - written by Filipe Mukenga and Mushima (origin unknown).  Music is of great importance in the Angolan lifestyle and it is not unusual to encounter a cappella renditions of the most popular Angolan and Brazilian songs.  Lyrics of these songs are sung in Portuguese, which is spoken by most Angolans as first or second language, alongside Bantu languages.

Some other popular Angolan musicians include Teta Lando, Carlos Lamartine, Kituxi, Waldemar Bastos, Afra Sound Star and Sam Mangwana, who was of dual Congolese-Angolan heritage.

Kuduro

For some time, a new, more electronic music movement, called kuduro, has blossomed in Angola. It combines traditional Angolan Kilapanga, Semba and Soca with Western house and techno. The main proponent of kuduro is the international group Buraka Som Sistema although there are a number of artists working on the national scene and a growing number of bedroom producers.

Kizomba

The most popular genre today is kizomba. Kizomba is a partnered social dance, that is quickly gaining worldwide attention, especially in Europe and North America. Discussions about kizomba employ words such as ‘connected,’ ‘sensual’ and ‘intimate,’ creating dance experiences and a wider scene laden with affect and underlying eroticism. The kizomba rhythm and movement is derived from an up-beat semba, meaning “a touch of the bellies,” which is a characteristic posture of the dance.
Kizomba supports a fairly large number of artists singing in both English and Portuguese.  The biggest producer in the Kizomba field is Nelo Paim who works in conjunction with Afonso Quintas and LS Productions. Eduardo Paim, Nelos's older brother, has released 10 albums and appeared in concerts worldwide.

See also
Angolan musicians

References

External links
Funk Before War In Angola by NPR
National Geographic World Music : Angola

Angolan music
Angolan culture